Vasily Ivanovich Vlasenko (10 January 1928 – 5 August 2020) was a Soviet middle-distance runner. He competed in the men's 3000 metres steeplechase at the 1956 Summer Olympics.

References

External links
 

1928 births
2020 deaths
Athletes (track and field) at the 1956 Summer Olympics
Soviet male middle-distance runners
Soviet male steeplechase runners
Olympic athletes of the Soviet Union
Place of birth missing